The St. Imier Congress was a meeting of the Jura Federation and anti-authoritarian apostates of the First International in September 1872.

Background 

Among the ideological debates within the socialist First International, Karl Marx and Mikhail Bakunin disagreed on the revolutionary role of the working class and political struggle. Following the demise of the 1871 Paris Commune, the International debated whether the proletariat should create its own state (Marx's position) or continue making commune attempts (Bakunin's position). Marx arranged the International's 1872 Congress in The Hague, the Netherlands, where the Swiss Bakunin could not attend without arrest in Germany or France. The Hague Congress sided with Marx and expelled Bakunin from the International over aspects of his dissent and person, causing a split that would ultimately end the organization.

International delegates of the minority opposed to Bakunin's expulsion met early in the September 1872 Hague Congress, in which 16 delegates (Spanish, Belgian, Dutch, Jurassic, and some American and French) privately decided to band together as anti-authoritarians. Before the vote, they presented a signed Minority Declaration, in which they expressed that the Congress's business ran counter to their represented countries' principles. They wished to remain administrative contact and maintain federative autonomy within the International in lieu of splitting it. Following the Hague Congress, anti-authoritarian minority delegates traveled to Brussels and issued a statement that they would not recognize the Congress's proceedings. They considered the circumstances around Bakunin's expulsion as unjust and encouraged anti-authoritarian federations to protest. The group continued on to Switzerland, where some met with Bakunin in Zurich.

Congress 

Earlier, in late August, the Italian Federation and Jura Federation began to plan an international alternative congress in Switzerland. The Italians and Errico Malatesta arrived in Zurich during the Hague Congress. They were joined by Andrea Costa and The Hague delegates Adhémar Schwitzguébel, Carlo Cafiero, and those from Spain. Bakunin presented his drafts for an Alliance organization to serve allied delegates in the International, but few took the effort seriously.

The international alternative congress met in St. Imier on September 14 and 15, 1872. The group of 16 included Bakunin, the Zurich group, and a Russian group from Zurich. Prior to the international congress, Schwitzguébel read a report. The group then resolved to reject as unjust the Hague Congress and its General Council's authoritarianism. A second resolution upheld the honor of the expelled Bakunin and Guillaume, and recognized the two within the Jura International.

The alternative congress followed these proceedings. In four groups, the delegates wrote resolutions on September 15 and 16. All four of the resolutions were passed unanimously on the 16th.

Its first resolution held that the Hague Congress majority's sole intent was to make the International more authoritarian, and resolved to reject that Congress's resolutions and the authority of its new General Council. The second resolution, the St. Imier pact, was a "pact of friendship, solidarity, and mutual defense" joining all interested federations against the General Council's authoritarian interests. The third resolution condemned the Hague Congress's advocacy for a singular path to proletariat social emancipation. It declared that the proletariat's first duty is to destroy all political power, rejected political organization (even temporary) towards this end as even more dangerous than contemporary governments, and advocated for uncompromising solidarity between proletarians internationally. The resolutions were bolder in language than the Hague Congress's Minority Declaration, likely on account of Bakunin's presence.

Delegates 

The St. Imier Congress delegates included:

Italian Federation
 Andrea Costa
 Carlo Cafiero
 Mikhail Bakunin
 Errico Malatesta
 Lodovico Nabruzzi
 Giuseppi Fanelli

Jura Federation
 James Guillaume
 Adhémar Schwitzguébel

Spanish Federation
 
 Rafael Farga
 Nicolás Alonso Marselau
 Tomás González Morago

French sections
 
 

American sections
 Gustave Lefrançais

References

Bibliography 

 

1872 conferences
1872 in politics
Anarchism in Switzerland
History of anarchism
History of socialism
Jura Federation
International Workingmen's Association
Political congresses
1872 in Switzerland
September 1872 events